In physics, chemistry, and materials science, percolation refers to the movement and filtering of fluids through porous materials. It is described by Darcy's law. Broader applications have since been developed that cover connectivity of many systems modeled as lattices or graphs, analogous to connectivity of lattice components in the filtration problem that modulates capacity for percolation.

Background
During the last decades, percolation theory, the mathematical study of percolation, has brought new understanding and techniques to a broad range of topics in physics, materials science, complex networks, epidemiology, and other fields. For example, in geology, percolation refers to filtration of water through soil and permeable rocks. The water flows to recharge the groundwater in the water table and aquifers. In places where infiltration basins or septic drain fields are planned to dispose of substantial amounts of water, a percolation test is needed beforehand to determine whether the intended structure is  likely to succeed or fail.
In two dimensional square lattice  percolation is defined as follows. A site is "occupied" with
probability p or "empty" (in which case its edges are removed) with probability 1 – p; the
corresponding problem is called site percolation, see Fig. 2.

Percolation typically exhibits universality. Statistical physics concepts such as scaling theory, renormalization, phase transition, critical phenomena and fractals are used to characterize percolation properties.
Combinatorics is commonly employed to study percolation thresholds.

Due to the complexity involved in obtaining exact results from analytical models of percolation, computer simulations are typically used.  The current fastest algorithm for percolation was published in 2000 by Mark Newman and Robert Ziff.

Examples
 Coffee percolation (see Fig. 1), where the solvent is water, the permeable substance is the coffee grounds, and the soluble constituents are the chemical compounds that give coffee its color, taste, and aroma.
 Movement of weathered material down on a slope under the earth's surface.
 Cracking of trees with the presence of two conditions, sunlight and pressure.
 Collapse and robustness of biological virus shells to random subunit removal (experimentally-verified fragmentation of viruses).
 Transport in porous media.
 Spread of diseases.
 Surface roughening.
 Dental percolation, increase rate of decay under crowns because of a conducive environment for strep mutants and lactobacillus
 Potential sites for septic systems are tested by the "perc test". Example/theory: A hole (usually 6–10 inches in diameter) is dug in the ground surface (usually 12–24" deep). Water is filled in to the hole, and the time is measured for a drop of one inch in the water surface. If the water surface quickly drops, as usually seen in poorly-graded sands, then it is a potentially good place for a septic "leach field". If the hydraulic conductivity of the site is low (usually in clayey and loamy soils), then the site is undesirable.

See also

 Branched polymer
 Conductance
 Critical exponents
 Fragmentation
 Gelation
 Giant component
 Groundwater recharge
 Immunization
 Network theory
 Percolation critical exponents
 Percolation theory
 Percolation threshold
 Polymerization
 Self-organization
 Self-organized criticality
 Septic tank
 Supercooled water
 Water pipe percolator

References

Further reading
 Kesten, Harry; "What is percolation?", in Notices of the AMS, May 2006.
 Sahimi, Muhammad; Applications of Percolation Theory, Taylor & Francis, 1994.  (cloth),  (paper).
 Grimmett, Geoffrey; Percolation (2. ed). Springer Verlag, 1999.
 Stauffer, Dietrich; and Aharony, Ammon; Introduction to Percolation Theory, Taylor & Francis, 1994, revised second edition, .
 Kirkpatrick, Scott; "Percolation and Conduction", in Reviews of Modern Physics, 45, 574, 1973.
 Rodrigues, Edouard; Remarkable properties of pawns on a hexboard 
 Bollobás, Béla; Riordan, Oliver; Percolation, Cambridge University Press, 2006, .
 Grimmett, Geoffrey; Percolation, Springer, 1999

Systems theory
Combinatorics